Fountain Tire Holdings Ltd. is a Canadian tire dealer and automotive service provider with 160 consumer locations in Central and Western Canada. The company also provides tires and tire-related services to commercial truck fleets and off-road vehicles used in agriculture, oil and gas, mining and construction.

Fountain Tire operates on a 50/50 partnership model whereby the majority of Fountain Tire managers own equity in their stores. The company was named one of “Canada’s Best Managed Companies” since 1994.

History
Fountain Tire was founded in 1956 by Bill Fountain. The company started as a small, double-bay garage in Wainwright, Alberta, and offered in-the-field service to farmers. As it grew, Bill Fountain decided to offer local managers 50 percent equity in their stores, still in use today. 

In 1976, Bill Fountain was killed in a car accident, leaving behind a network of 19 stores and partners.

The 1980s included further expansion for Fountain Tire: a move to the new head office in Edmonton and a change in Fountain Tire's expansion strategy. On September 24, 1987, Fountain Tire sold 49 percent of its business to Goodyear Canada. By the end of the 1990s, 100 new Fountain Tire stores had been added across Western Canada.

In 2014, Fountain Tire relocated its corporate headquarters to a new facility in the South Edmonton, called Fountain Tire Place.

In 2016, Fountain Tire reached its 60th anniversary. The company launched a 60-day cross-country campaign paying tribute to the 1950s with a drive-in movie tour and giveaways of 60,000 AIR MILES.

Today, Fountain Tire operates 160 locations in Canada from Victoria, B.C. to Vaughan, Ontario.

Corporate

Headquarters
Fountain Tire's corporate office is located in South Edmonton at Fountain Tire Place.

Community Involvement 
Fountain Tire supports the United Way, Junior Achievement and local charities in cities across Canada. In 2015, the company donated a 15-seat passenger van to Grow Calgary, Canada's largest urban farm, which supplies the local food bank. In 2019, Fountain Tire CEO Brent Hesje received a Northern Lights Award of Distinction by the Edmonton Chamber of Commerce in recognition of his corporate, community and industry leadership.

Marketing
Fountain Tire's slogans have included "Home of the Tire Experts," "Winning the West," "Your Alberta Tire Store" and “Trust. Fountain Tire.”

Actor and comedian Thom Sharp became Fountain Tire's spokesperson in 1994 and was known as “The Fountain Tire Guy” for more than 20 years.

In 2018, Fountain Tire launched a new brand and tag line, “We’re on this road together,” to reflect a philosophy of partnership across the company.

Awards 
Fountain Tire is a longstanding Platinum Club member of Canada's Best Managed Companies (Deloitte),  winning its first award in 1994.

Fountain Tire's “Fan Bods ” campaign won three Gold and two Silver awards at the 2019 Clio Sports awards and a Silver Digital – Apps/Mobile and Merit, PR – Community Building at the 2019 Marketing awards. The campaign allowed hockey fans to spell out messages using the painted bodies of Fountain Tire employees in support of the company's hometown Edmonton Oilers.

References

External links
Fountain Tire website

Companies based in Edmonton
Canadian brands
Automotive companies of Canada
Automotive part retailers
Automotive repair shops
1956 establishments in Alberta
Retail companies established in 1956